Ikpe Umoh Imeh  (or Obong (Chief) Ikpe Umoh Imeh) (April 22, 1906 – September 29, 2004) was a Member of Parliament from Akwa Ibom State and Deputy Speaker of Parliament for the Eastern Region, Nigeria during the Nigerian First Republic. Umoh was born in Onuk Ukpom in Abak Local Government Area. His father was the late Chief Umoh Imeh Akpakpan Eso Akpan, a farmer of Ntobong Royal Family. His mother, Nwaeka Umoabasi, was from Ikono in Abak.

Education 
Imeh attended Abak Government School from 1923 to 1929. From there he attended the Uyo Teachers Training College (now University of Uyo) where he obtained his teaching certification in 1934. He studied agricultural science in Umuahia.

Career 
In his early years Imeh worked as a teacher and as a civil servant until he entered politics in 1951. Imeh first won an election into the Eastern House of Assembly, Enugu State with the National Council of Nigeria and the Cameroons party.

  January 1952—Federal House of Representatives, Lagos
  1953—reelection to the Eastern House of Assembly
  1954—Acting Minister of Local Government
  1955—First Minister of Trade Eastern Region, Nigeria
  1956—1957—Minister of Welfare
  1960—Deputy Speaker, Eastern Nigeria House of Assembly
  1960–1961—Chairman, Public Accounts Committee

Imeh's career in politics ended with the military overthrow of the Nigerian First Republic civilian government by Chukwuma Kaduna Nzeogwu in January 1966. During and after the Nigerian Civil War, Imeh returned to teaching. In 1981, under the Nigerian Second Republic, President Shehu Shagari awarded Imeh a National Honour of the Cadre of Officer of the Order of the Niger

References

Nigerian royalty
People from Akwa Ibom State
Officers of the Order of the Niger
1906 births
2004 deaths